Grand Lyon, is a developing residential area and suburban area in North Chennai, a metropolitan city in Tamil Nadu, India. Grand Lyon is well connected with Red Hills and Puzhal which has good transportation.good water facilities.

Location

Grant Lyon is located in North Chennai with  Red Hills in the west and Puzhal to the South. Other neighbouring areas include Vadagarai, Pulli Lyon, Athivakkam. Grant Lyon is located in between Vadagarai and Vadaperumbakkam in Madhavaram-Red Hills High Road, and very close to Puzhal aeri.

Surroundings

Neighbourhoods in Chennai